{{DISPLAYTITLE:Delta2 Tauri}}

Delta2 Tauri (δ2 Tauri) is a solitary, white-hued star in the zodiac constellation of Taurus. Based upon an annual parallax shift of 20.21 mas as seen from Earth, it is located roughly 161 light years distant from the Sun. It is separated from δ1 Tauri by 0.3° on the sky and is faintly visible to the naked eye with an apparent visual magnitude of +4.80. The star is considered a member of the Hyades cluster.

At the estimated age of 449 million years, this is an A-type main-sequence star with a stellar classification of A2 Vs, where the 's' suffix indicates narrow (sharp) absorption lines. It has 1.8 times the mass of the Sun and about 1.8 times the Sun's radius. The star is radiating 27 times the Sun's luminosity from its photosphere at an effective temperature of 7,997 K.

Since A-type stars are not normally a source of X-rays, this emission may be coming from an unknown companion or from a line of sight source.

References

A-type main-sequence stars
Tauri, Delta
Taurus (constellation)
Durchmusterung objects
Tauri, 064
027819
020542
1380